2009 Japanese Super Cup was the Japanese Super Cup competition. The match was played at National Stadium in Tokyo on February 28, 2009. Kashima Antlers won the championship.

Match details

References

Japanese Super Cup
2009 in Japanese football
Kashima Antlers matches
Gamba Osaka matches